Hoverforce (also published as Resolution 101) is a 1990 video game published by Accolade.

Gameplay
Hoverforce is a game in which MetaCity in the future year of 2050 A.D. is locked in ongoing drug wars, presented as a hybrid of an action game and simulation game.

Reception
David M. Wilson reviewed the game for Computer Gaming World, and stated that "Hoverforce has its weaknesses, but the game offers players just what is promised. It is a real whiz-bang shoot-'em-up! There is enough destruction to please even the most violent player. Players who are seeking a fast-paced, challenging arcade action game are invited to join Sheriff Stone's squad of Future Narcs."

Jonathan Bell for Compute! said "Hover-Force deserves a place on the hard drives of action fans everywhere. You need only take the controls of the HoverKill, and you'll be hooked. Hunting down Alterants is a hard habit to break."

Tom Malcom for Info gave the game four stars and said "If you're immune to motion sickness, Hoverforce will give you some of the best mind-bending action you've ever had."

Damon Howarth for Page 6 said "This is a good value budget game that I would be happy to recommend since it combines a strong shoot em up with a fairly effective driving game. one game that does pass the test of time."

Reviews
ST Format - Jun, 1990
Amiga Format - Jul, 1990
Amiga Computing - Sep, 1990
The One - Jul, 1990
The Games Machine - Jul, 1990
Zzap! - Jul, 1990
ASM (Aktueller Software Markt) - Jul, 1990
Amiga Power - May, 1991

References

1990 video games
Amiga games
Atari ST games
Cyberpunk video games
DOS games
Dystopian video games
First-person shooters
Vehicle simulation games
Video games about crime
Video games about police officers
Video games about the illegal drug trade
Video games developed in the United Kingdom
Video games set in the 2050s
Video games set in the United States